Can't Contain It is the seventh album by Mustard Plug.  It was released in January 2014.

Dave Kirchgessner stated that the album "is strong evolution in our sound and our art while still staying true to the goal of playing party music for punk rockers."  The album features guest appearances by Dan Potthast of MU330  and Sean Bonnette of Andrew Jackson Jihad.

Track listing
 "We Came to Party"
 "The All-Nighter"
 "Aye Aye Aye"
 "White Noise"
 "Bang!"
 "Burn It Down"
 "Shakin' It Up"
 "Blame Yourself"
 "Gone and Faded"
 "What Does She Know?"
 "Twist the Knife"
 "It's You"
 "The Perfect Plan"
 "Running Out of Time"

References

2007 albums
Hopeless Records albums
Mustard Plug albums